Jaba Gelashvili (born March 7, 1993) is an alpine skier from Georgia.  He competed for Georgia at the 2010 Winter Olympics.  His best result was a 50th place finish in the giant slalom.

References

External links
 
 

1993 births
Living people
Male alpine skiers from Georgia (country)
Olympic alpine skiers of Georgia (country)
Alpine skiers at the 2010 Winter Olympics